Porsha is an Upazila of Naogaon District in the Division of Rajshahi, Bangladesh.

Geography

It has 18047 households, and total area 252.83 km2.

Porsha Upazila is bounded by Sapahar Upazila on the north, Patnitala and Mohadevpur Upazilas on the east, Gomostapur and Niamatpur Upazilas on the south, Habibpur and Bamangola CD Blocks in Malda district, West Bengal, India, on the west.

Demographics
According to 2011 Bangladesh census, Porsha had a population of 132,095. Males constituted 50.19% of the population and females 49.81%. Muslims formed 86.35% of the population, Hindus 10.38%, Christians 1.36% and others 1.90%. Porsha had a literacy rate of 42.52% for the population 7 years and above.

As of the 1991 Bangladesh census, Porsha had a population of 97279. Males constituted 50.18% of the population, and females 49.82%. This Upazila's eighteen up population is 48932. Porsha had an average literacy rate of 26.5% (7+ years), and the national average of 32.4% literate.

Administration
Porsha Thana was formed in 1933 and it was turned into an upazila in 1984.

Porsha Upazila is divided into six union parishads: Chhaor, Ganguria, Ghatnagar, Masidpur, Nithpur, and Tentulia. The union parishads are subdivided into 155 mauzas and 246 villages.

See also
Upazilas of Bangladesh
Districts of Bangladesh
Divisions of Bangladesh

References

Upazilas of Naogaon District